The 1988 All-Ireland Senior Club Camogie Championship for the leading clubs in the women's team field sport of camogie was won for the second year in succession and the seventh time in all by St Paul’s from Kilkenny, who defeated Glenamaddy from Galway in the final, played at Glenamaddy. It was the last club championship final to be played under the old match duration of 50 minutes.

Arrangements
The championship was organised on the traditional provincial system used in Gaelic Games since the 1880s, with Killeagh and Swatragh winning the championships of the other two provinces. Angela Downey was suspended after a controversial all Ireland semi-final between St Paul’s and Killeagh on October 23. Angela Downey and Breda Kelly of Killeagh were reported for striking in the match, although neither was sent off. It led to a six-month suspension for both. If the final with St Mary's, Glenamaddy had not been called off 24 hours before it was due to start, she would have collected a seventh club medal. Ann Downey scored 2–6 of St Paul’s total in the semi-final against Killeagh. Glanmaddy’s half time lead of 1-5 to 0-=1 was enough to sustain them through the other semi-final.

The Final
After the suspension of her sister, Ann Downey scored a late goal to win the title for St Paul’s

Final stages

References

External links
 Camogie Association

1988 in camogie
1988